{{Infobox given name
| name = Eva
| image= File:Evita (cropped).JPG
| imagesize=
| caption= Eva Perón
| pronunciation=
| gender = Feminine
| meaning = "life" 
| region = 
| origin = Latin, Hebrew
| related names = Eve, Ieva, Evita
| footnotes = 
}}

Eva is a female given name, the Latinate counterpart of English Eve, derived from a Hebrew name meaning "life" or "living one". It can also mean full of life or mother of life. It is the standard biblical form of Eve in many European languages.

Evita is a diminutive form of the Spanish name "Eva", most often referring to María Eva Duarte de Perón.

Popularity
Popularity in the United States peaked in 1989, when the name hit No. 31. Afterwards, use in the United States fell into the top 300s, eventually rising in frequency again in the 2000s. , it sat at No. 124.

In England and Wales, Eva was reasonably popular around 1900, but it has been little used since, Eve and Evie being the more popular forms today. The name is traditionally more popular in Ireland and Scotland, as an anglicisation of the Gaelic Aoife, meaning "shining" or "radiant".

The name is popular in continental Europe (particularly in Northern Europe after the Reformation).  The Hebrew equivalent of Eva is חוה (Ḥawwah, often anglicized as Chava), meaning "life".

 People 

 A–F 
 Eva Aariak (born 1955), Canadian politician
 Eva Adamová (born 1960), Czech volleyball player
 Eva Ahnert-Rohlfs (1912–1954), German astronomer
 Eva Ahuja (born 1980), Indian actress
 Eva Allen Alberti (1856-1938), American dramatics teacher
 Eva Alordiah (born 1988), Nigerian rapper, entertainer, make-up artist, & fashion designer
 Eva Amaral (born 1973), Spanish singer
 Eva Amurri (born 1985), American actress
 Eva Andén (1886–1970), Swedish lawyer
 Eva Angelina (born 1985), American adult film actress
 Eva Arvidsson (born 1948), Swedish politician
 Eva Asderaki (born 1982), Greek tennis chair umpire
 Eva Avila (born 1987), 2006 Canadian Idol winner
 Eva von Bahr (physicist) (1874–1962), Swedish scientist
 Eva von Bahr (born 1968), Swedish make-up artist and hair stylist 
 Eva Beem (1932–1944), Dutch Jewish child; gassed to death in Auschwitz concentration camp
 Eva Bella (born 2002), American voice actress
 Eva Blanco (1981-1997), Spanish murder victim 
 Eva Bowring (1892–1985), U.S. politician and United States Senator
 Eva Boto (born 1995), Slovenian singer
 Eva Narcissus Boyd (1943–2003), American singer
 Eva Braun (1912–1945), lover, and later wife, of Adolf Hitler
 Eva Maria Brown (1856-1917), American social reformer
 Eva Burrows (1929–2015), 13th General of The Salvation Army
 Eva Cadena, Mexican politician from Veracruz
 Eva Carneiro, Gibraltar-born British sports medicine specialist and former first-team doctor at Chelsea F.C.
 Eva Cassidy (1963–1996), American singer
 Eva Celbová (born 1975), Czech beach volleyball player
 Eva Christodoulou (born 1983), Greek gymnast
 Eva Clare (1885–1961), Canadian musician and educator
 Eva Clarke (born 1945), British-Czech Holocaust survivor 
 Eva Clayton (born 1934), U.S. politician and United States Congresswoman
 Eva Crocker, Canadian writer
 Eva Cruz (born 1974), Puerto Rican volleyball player
 Eva Czemerys (1940–1996), German-born film actress
 Eva Dahlgren (born 1960), Swedish pop musician
 Eva Dickson (1905–1938), Swedish explorer
 Eva Dimas (born 1973), Salvadoran weightlifter
 Eva Craig Graves Doughty (1852–?), American journalist
 Eva Duldig (born 1938), Austrian-born Australian and Dutch tennis player, author
 Eva Ekeblad (1724–1786), Swedish botanist
 Eva Fabian (born 1993), American-Israeli world champion swimmer

G–L
 Eva Gabor (1919–1995), Hungarian-born American actress
 Eva Gore-Booth (1870–1926), Irish poet and dramatist, and a committed suffragist, social worker and labour activist
 Eva Gothlin (1957–2006), Swedish historian
 Eva Grant  (born 2006), British pageant queen and media personality
 Eva Gray (born 1971), British actress
 Eva Gray (born 2000), English cricketer
 Eva Gredal (1927–1995), Danish politician
 Eva Green (born 1980), French actress
 Eva Kinney Griffith (1852–1918), American journalist, activist, novelist, editor, publisher
 Eva-Lena Gustavsson (born 1956), Swedish politician
 Eva Herman (born 1958), German television presenter and author 
 Eva Herzigová (born 1973), Czech supermodel
 Eva Hesse (1936–1970),  German-born American artist
 Eva Horváthová (born 1974), Slovak physician and politician
 Eva Jinek (born 1978), American-born Dutch journalist and television presenter
 Eva Kaili (born 1978), Greek politician
 Eva-Lotta Kiibus (born 2003), Estonian figure skater
 Eva Köhler (born 1947), wife of the German President Horst Köhler
 Eva Kotamanidou (1936–2020), Greek actress
 Eva LaRue (born 1966), American actress
 Eva Longoria (born 1975), American actress

 M–P 
 Eva Anne Madden (1863–1958), American educator, journalist, playwright, author
 Eva Magni (1909–2005), Italian stage and film actress
 Eva Maler (born 1988), German playwright
 Eva Melmuková (1932–2022), Czech Lutherian theologist and historian
 Eva Mendes (born 1974), American actress
 Eva Merthen (1723–1811), known as "The Duchess of Finland"
 Eva Miranda, Spanish mathematician
 Eva Moll (born 1975), German contemporary artist
 Eva Moltesen (1871–1934), Finnish-Danish writer and peace activist
 Eva Moore (1870–1955), English actress
 Eva Morris (1885–2000), native of England, known for a time as the oldest recognized person in the world
 Eva Moskowitz (born 1964), U.S. educator and former politician
 Eva, birth name of Hatice Muazzez, mother of the Ottoman Sultan Ahmed II
 Eva Neander (1921–1950), Swedish journalist
 Eva Nedinkovska (born 1983), ethnic Macedonian singer
 Eva Noblezada (born 1996), American theatre actress and singer
 Eva Pagels (born 1954), German field hockey player
 Eva Palmer-Sikelianos (1874-1952), American choreographer and art historian
 Eva Pawlik (1927–1983), Austrian figure skater
 Eva Perón (1919–1952), Argentinian First Lady, political leader, actor, and philanthropist; wife of Juan Perón
 Eva Haljecka Petković (1870–1947), Serbian doctor
 Eva Philbin (1914–2005), Irish chemist
 Eva Pigford (born 1984), American model
 Eva Polna (born 1975), Russian singer, composer, and songwriter
 Eva Polttila (born 1946), retired Finnish TV news anchor
 Eva Pölzing, a German singer
 Eva Pope (born 1967), English actress
 Eva Püssa (born 1971), Estonian actress

 R–Z 
 Eva Reign, American actress and journalist
 Eva Rivas, Russian-Armenian singer
 Eva Marie Saint (born 1924), American actress
 Éva Sas (born 1970), French politician
 Eva Silverstein (born 1970), American physicist and string theorist
 Eva Simons (born 1984), Dutch singer
 Eva Siracká (1926-2023), Slovak physician
 Eva Munson Smith (1843–1915), American composer, poet, author
 Eva Tanguay (1878–1947), Canadian-born vaudeville entertainer
 Eva Griffith Thompson (1842–1925), American newspaper editor
 Eva Winther (1921–2014), Swedish politician

 Fictional characters 
 Eva, Marco's mother from the Animorphs book series
 Eva, a character in the 2008 3D computer-animated film Igor EVE, a character in the 2008 Pixar film WALL-E whose name is mispronounced "Eva" by the film's title character
 Eva, the Goddess of Water in the mythology of the MMORPG Lineage II EVA, character in the Metal Gear video game series
 Eva, a female keel-billed toucan who is Rafael's wife in Rio and Rio 2 Eva, a character in the Canadian animated television series Total Drama Eva, one of the main characters in the anime series Tweeny Witches Eva, protagonist character in What's Left of Me by Kat Zhang
 Eva Falco, a character in the British soap opera Hollyoaks Eva Kant, character from Diabolik comics and Danger: Diabolik film
 Eva Luna, main character of Isabel Allende's picaresque novel
 Eva Kviig Mohn, a main character in the Norwegian television series Skam Evangeline St. Clare, called Eva, a major character in the novel Uncle Tom's Cabin Eva Price, a character in the British soap opera Coronation Street Eva Strong, a character in the British soap opera Hollyoaks Eva Ushiromiya, a character in the visual novel, manga and anime series Umineko When They Cry Eva Wei, the main character of the Jetix animated television series Oban Star Racers Eva Zimmer, a character in the webseries The Zimmer Twins Eva Nilsson, character on the series Star Trek: Discovery Eva, mother of twins Dante and Vergil in the Devil May Cry series. Also the wife of Sparda.

See also
 
 Eve (name)
 Evita (disambiguation)

References

 The Best Baby Name Book in the Whole Wide World'' (1984), by Bruce Lansky
 Social Security Administration: Popular Baby Names
 

Feminine given names
Given names
Italian feminine given names
Indian feminine given names
Spanish feminine given names
English feminine given names
Estonian feminine given names
Portuguese feminine given names
German feminine given names
Dutch feminine given names
Scandinavian feminine given names
Slovene feminine given names
Swedish feminine given names
Arabic feminine given names
Czech feminine given names
Greek feminine given names
Modern names of Hebrew origin
Lists of people by given name
Slovak feminine given names